Charlie Yankos  (born 29 May 1961) is an Australian former footballer who played for the Australian national team 49 times and scored 7 international goals. He captained the national team on 30 occasions between 1986 and 1989.

Charlie Yankos started his local football career with former NSL club Heidelberg United in 1979 and became one of the greatest players to wear the gold and black colors. He was also an important part of APIA Leichhardt's 1987 NSL title victory.

International career
Charlie Yankos represented the Australian national team on 49 times including 13 world cup qualifiers, captaining the side on 30 occasions and scoring 7 international goals. He participated in the 1985 and 1989 World Cup qualifying campaigns, and also played in the Seoul Olympics in 1988 where Australia made the quarterfinals. 

Yankos scored a long range goal from over 30 yards in the 1988 Australian Bicentennial Gold Cup against then-World Champions Argentina. In a 1990 FIFA World Cup qualification away match against Israel, he scored an equaliser for Australia, again with a long range free kick.

After retirement
Following his retirement from football, Yankos moved into a successful career in business. He was inducted into the Football Australia Hall of Fame in 1999.

Charlie Yankos Street in the Sydney suburb of Glenwood is named for him.

References

External links
 Oz Football profile

1961 births
Living people
Australian soccer players
Australian people of Greek descent
Australia international soccer players
Olympic soccer players of Australia
Footballers at the 1988 Summer Olympics
National Soccer League (Australia) players
APIA Leichhardt FC players
Blacktown City FC players
PAOK FC players
West Adelaide SC players
Association football defenders
Australian expatriate soccer players
Australian expatriate sportspeople in Greece
Expatriate footballers in Greece
Soccer players from Melbourne
Recipients of the Medal of the Order of Australia